Joe A. McClain (July 16, 1928 – July 30, 2016) was an American politician. He served as a Democratic member of the Florida House of Representatives.

Life and career 
McClain was born in Etowah, Tennessee, the son of Ella and Joe H. McClain. He served in the United States Army Air Corps for two years. He attended Stetson University and Stetson University College of Law.

In 1958, McClain was elected to the Florida House of Representatives, serving until 1962. He was an assistant state attorney for seven years, serving under James Russell. He was also a general counsel of the school board of Pasco County, Florida for 30 years.

McClain died in July 2016, at the age of 88.

References 

1928 births
2016 deaths
People from Etowah, Tennessee
Democratic Party members of the Florida House of Representatives
20th-century American politicians
Stetson University College of Law alumni
20th-century American lawyers
Florida lawyers
People from Pasco County, Florida